Lounge may refer to:

Architecture 
 Lounge (British English), or lounge room (Australian English), alternate terms for the living room of a dwelling.
 Lounge, a public waiting area in a hotel's lobby.
 Cocktail Lounge (or simply Lounge), a style of commercial alcohol-serving bar, typically found in hotels and restaurants. 
 Airport lounge, or train lounge (e.g., AMTRAK's Acela Lounge), a premium waiting area for passengers
Dome lounge, a type of domed railroad passenger car that includes lounge, cafe, dining or other space on the upper level

Arts, entertainment, and media
 Book cafe, or lounge
 Piano bar, or lounge
 Lounge music, type of easy listening music popular in the 1950s and 1960s

Fashion
 Lounge jacket, also called a suit jacket or suit coat, is a jacket in classic menswear that is part of a lounge suit
 Lounge suit, style of suit (clothing)

Other uses 
 Chaise lounge, an English language derivative  of the French term chaise longue ("long chair")
 Lounge car, a railroad car selling food and beverages

See also
Lounge lizard (disambiguation)
  Lounging (disambiguation)